Aenon Bible College is an accredited, Pentecostal seminary and higher education institution headquartered in Indianapolis, Indiana. 

Besides the on campus program, Aenon runs a Distance Learning program and an online education system. It serves as a training center for ministers of the Pentecostal Assemblies of the World (PAW)

History
in 1940, ministers Karl F. Smith and Labaugh Stansbury obtaining approval for the founding of Aenon from the general assembly of the Pentecostal Assemblies.  The college was dedicated on January 16, 1941 in a ceremony at the Church of Christ of Apostolic Faith (CCAF) in Columbus, Ohio . 

In 1944, Aenon moved to a three story 16-room campus in Indianapolis.  In 1969, that facility was destroyed by fire.  Aenon moved to the CCAF campus.

In 1981, Aenon had completed its moved to the Pentecostal Plaza in Indianapolis.  In 1996. the college moved to its present location,  a 3-story 2300 sq. feet building. 

Aenon has an enrollment averaging 2,000 students in over 100 satellite institutes around the world. The current college president is Bishop Michael D. Hannah Sr.

Aenon School of Theology and Bible College
Bishop Frank R. Bowdan established Aenon Los Angeles as a "quasi extension" of Aenon Bible College. The West Coast branch headed by Dr. Norma Sylvester Jackson became highly recognized and upon her death in 2005, the college underwent a transition and in 2007 the Aenon School of Theology and Bible College (AST) was established at 21200 South Figueroa Street, Carson, CA independently of Aenon Bible College.

References

External links
Pentecostal Assemblies of the World website - Aenon Bible College, Indianapolis, Indiana page
Aenon Bible College Online website
Aenon School of Theology, Carson, CA website

Bible colleges
1941 establishments in Indiana
Pentecostalism in Indiana